Fort Selkirk is a former trading post on the Yukon River at the confluence of the Pelly River in Canada's Yukon. For many years it was home to the Selkirk First Nation (Northern Tutchone).

History
Archaeological evidence shows that the site has been in use for at least 8,000 years.

Robert Campbell established a Hudson's Bay Company trading post nearby in 1848. In early 1852, he moved the post to its current location. Resenting the interference of the Hudson's Bay Company with their traditional trade with interior Athabaskan First Nations, Chilkat Tlingit First Nation warriors attacked and looted the post that summer on Saturday, August 21, 1852.

The fort was rebuilt about 40 years later and became an important supply point along the Yukon River. 
At age 28, under the command of Inspector John Douglas Moodie, Francis Joseph Fitzgerald was the first person of European descent to chart an overland route from Edmonton to Fort Selkirk, Yukon via northern British Columbia and the Pelly River (1897). The voyage took eleven months, having covered about 1,000 miles.  As a result of this achievement, Fitzgerald was promoted corporal in 1899.

Fort Selkirk was essentially abandoned by the mid-1950s after the Klondike Highway bypassed it and Yukon River traffic died down.

Restoration and historic status
Many of the buildings have been restored and the Fort Selkirk Historic Site is owned and managed jointly by the Selkirk First Nation and the Yukon Government's Department of Tourism and Culture. There is no road access. Most visitors get there by boat, though there is an airstrip, Fort Selkirk Aerodrome, at the site.

See also
Volcano Mountain
Fort Selkirk Volcanic Field
Ne Ch'e Ddhawa
Fort Yukon, Alaska

References

External links
Virtual Museum Canada
Yukon Heritage Resources Unit
Article about Fort Selkirk
Photos

Selkirk
Klondike Gold Rush
Hudson's Bay Company forts
Ghost towns in Yukon